Queens of the Qing Dynasty is a Canadian drama film, directed by Ashley McKenzie and released in 2022. The film stars Sarah Walker as Star, a troubled teenager who has been hospitalized following a suicide attempt, and Ziyin Zheng as An, a genderqueer volunteer at the hospital whose companionship and friendship helps Star to feel less isolated as they bond over their shared uncertainties about their futures.

Walker is a first-time film actress.  Her character (Star) was based on a teenager who auditioned for a role in McKenzie's prior film Werewolf; Sarah Walker encompassed the character of Star and to prepare for her role was lucky to be able to spend some time with the teenager who McKenzie had become friends with.

The film premiered on February 15, 2022, in the Encounters program at the 72nd Berlin International Film Festival. It had its Canadian premiere in the Wavelengths program of the 2022 Toronto International Film Festival.

Cast
 Sarah Walker as Star
 Ziyin Zheng as An
 Wendy Wishart as Gail
 Jana Reddick as social worker
 Yao Xue as Violet
 Cherlena “Sassi” Brake as Cher
 Reg MacDonald as charge nurse
 Carl Getto as psychiatrist
 Nidhin KH as boyfriend
 Rony Robson as OR nurse

Critical response
Jared Mobarak of The Film Stage positively reviewed the film, writing that "I wouldn’t go so far as saying Queens of the Qing Dynasty is an acquired taste. You simply need to be prepared that the words “swift” or “kinetic” aren't descriptors I'd use. It's purely about the characters as well as the place where it's set since “fun” is getting drunk at a Chinese restaurant, not some big city club. Because while Star and An fantasize and joke about wishing they could become trophy wives of old, their roads are not paved in gold. Having each other sitting shotgun, however, does make the trip a whole lot brighter. And experiencing their queer characters candidly existing on-screen without the usual miserabilism of external abuse looming large (their internal hardships and uncertainty lends enough drama) is reason enough to follow along."

For The Movable Fest, Stephen Saito wrote that "McKenzie certainly has an aesthetically distinctive vision as a filmmaker, but what shouldn’t be so unique yet is remains her rare ability to neither look down on her characters or make them subjects of pity when working their way out of dire straits, following Star and An into their private spaces without ever feeling as if she’s encroaching and allowing Walker, Zheng and even those with the smallest bit parts suggest far bigger lives off-screen than the glimpse you get will afford."

Awards
The film was shortlisted for the Directors Guild of Canada's 2022 Jean-Marc Vallée DGC Discovery Award.

The film won three awards at the 2022 FIN Atlantic Film Festival, for Best Atlantic Feature, Best Atlantic Director and the Joan Orenstein & David Renton Award for Outstanding Performance in Acting (Walker). It has also been nominated for a Canadian Screen Award for "Achievement in Costume Design".

References

External links

2022 films
2022 drama films
2022 LGBT-related films
Canadian drama films
Canadian LGBT-related films
English-language Canadian films
Films directed by Ashley McKenzie
LGBT-related drama films
2020s English-language films
2020s Canadian films
Films about suicide